Francisco Antonio Cano (November 24, 1865 - May 10, 1935) was a very recognized Colombian painter, sculptor, writer, and engraver from Antioquia, who is famous for his works in which he portrays the cultural identity of the country and region. One of his best known works is Horizons, which depicts the beginning of the colonization of Antioquia (1913) that took place during the second half of the nineteenth and early twentieth centuries.  He was  a professor and  director of the School of Fine Arts in Medellín and in Bogotá.  And also a mentor of other famous Colombian artists, such as Pedro Nel Gómez,  Sergio Trujillo Magnenat and Marco Tobón Mejía.

Biography
Cano was born in the town of Yarumal, Colombia, on November 24, 1865, to a poor family. He was son to José María Cano Álvarez and María Jesús Cardona y Villegas.  He had a brother named José Ignacio.

He submitted drawings and vignettes for the newspaper Yarumal Annals of the Club. He received painting classes by Angel Maria Palomino and with Horacio Rodríguez Marino, he learned drawing techniques. He also took part in various important art exhibitions.

In 1896, he married María Sanín.

From 1898 to 1901, he received a scholarship to study in France, where he attended courses in Fine Arts at the Académie Julian and by Claude Monet. When he returned to Colombia, he opened his own workshop.

He was director and professor of the School of  Fine Arts in Medellín and Bogotá, and a member of the Colombian Academy of  Arts.

He is the great-uncle of the painter Fernando Granda Cano.

He died in Bogotá on May 10, 1935.

Works

Among his principal oils and watercolors are: The study of the painter, Mariano Ospina Rodríguez, Pedro Justo Berrío, Marcelino Vélez, The Apostle Paul, Mariano Montoya, Earthenware, Rafael Nunez, Still life of roses, Cristo del Perdon, Source of the observatory, Efe Gómez, the Girl of the Roses, The baptism of Christ, Horizons, The Virgin of the Lilies, Don Fidel Cano, Francisco Javier Cisneros, The voluptuousness of the sea, and Carolina Cárdenas portraits, among others.

For the Church of San José, Cano created the fountain in the courtyard and the gilded altarpiece named Baptism of Jesus.

Horizons
This oil painting is considered Cano's masterpiece. Horizons epitomizes the idealized migrant family. It portrays a young, fair-skinned colono family — consisting of a husband, wife, and child — sitting on a bluff, surrounded by mountains. The three members of the family are likened to the Holy family, with the woman dressed in blue and white like the Virgin Mary, with a baby on her lap. The gaze of the wife, child, and father are in the direction of the man's outstretched hand, which evokes Michelangelo's Creation of Adam, and that points toward an unseen, distant horizon.

His work has been copied and parodied several times by other artists and alumni. The original of Horizons is currently housed in the Museum of Antioquia.

Gallery

References

External links

 Biography from Luis Angel Arango Library (in Spanish)
 (es) banrepcultural.org, El pintor Francisco A. Cano: nacimiento de la academia de Antioquia
 (es)banrepcultural.or, Francisco Antonio Cano ,La voluptuosidad del mar (1924)

1865 births
1935 deaths
Colombian artists
Académie Julian alumni
Colombian painters
Colombian male painters
Colombian sculptors
19th-century engravers
20th-century engravers